Cunard-White Star Line, Ltd, was a British shipping line which existed between 1934 and 1949.

History
The company was created to control the joint shipping assets of the Cunard Line and the White Star Line after both companies experienced financial difficulties during the Great Depression. Cunard White Star controlled a total of twenty-five ocean liners (with Cunard contributing fifteen ships and White Star ten). Both Cunard and White Star were in dire financial trouble, and were looking to complete enormous liners: White Star had Hull 844 – – and Cunard had Hull 534, which would later become . In 1933, the British government agreed to provide assistance to the two competitors on the condition that they merge their North Atlantic operations. The agreement was completed on 30 December 1933. The merger took place on 10 May 1934, creating Cunard-White Star Limited. White Star contributed ten ships to the new company while Cunard contributed fifteen. Due to this arrangement, and since Hull 534 was Cunard's ship, Cunard owned 62% of the new company, with White Star owning the remaining 38%. White Star vessels flew the White Star flag over the Cunard flag while Cunard vessels flew the Cunard flag over the White Star flag.

Being in a better financial and operating state than White Star, Cunard began absorbing White Star assets and as a result, most of the White Star vessels were quickly disposed of or sent to the shipbreakers. White Star's flagship , the largest ship in the world until 1935, was sold in 1936.

In 1947, Cunard acquired White Star’s 38% share in the company and on 31 December 1949 the company had dropped the White Star name and was renamed Cunard Line. Both the Cunard and White Star house flags were flown on the company's liners at the time of the merger and thereafter. Georgic was scrapped in 1956, while Britannic made the final Liverpool–New York crossing of any White Star vessel from New York on 25 November 1960, and returned to Liverpool for the final time before sailing under her own power to the ship breakers. She was the last White Star liner in existence, leaving the passenger tender , which was also owned by the company until 1934, as the last White Star Line ship afloat.

Despite this, all Cunard Line ships flew both the Cunard and White Star Line house flags on their masts until late 1968. This was most likely because Nomadic remained in service with Cunard until 4 November 1968, and was sent to the breakers' yard, only to be bought for use as a floating restaurant. After this, the White Star flag was no longer flown, the White Star name was removed from Cunard operations and all remnants of both White Star Line and Cunard-White Star Line were retired. Cunard operated as a separate entity until 1999, when it was fully acquired by Carnival Corporation.

Fleet

References

Works cited

External links
 Cunard White Star History and Ephemera GG Archives

Cunard Line
Transport companies established in 1934
Transport companies disestablished in 1949
Defunct cruise lines
Packet (sea transport)
Defunct shipping companies of the United Kingdom
Transatlantic shipping companies
1934 establishments in England
1949 disestablishments in England
1949 mergers and acquisitions
British companies disestablished in 1949
British companies established in 1934
Defunct companies based in Liverpool